The Gate of Doña Urraca (Spanish: Puerta de Doña Urraca) is a gate which gives access to the walled city of Zamora, Spain. It is named after the historical figure Urraca of Zamora.

The medieval structure has been given the heritage listing Bien de Interés Cultural,  and has been protected since 1874.

References

See also 

 List of Bien de Interés Cultural in the Province of Zamora

Bien de Interés Cultural landmarks in the Province of Zamora
City gates in Spain
Buildings and structures in Zamora, Spain